Hell Hunters is a 1988 horror film produced and directed by , and starring Maud Adams, George Lazenby and Stewart Granger.

Plot
A Nazi war criminal mad scientist creates a spider serum which turns people into Nazi zombies. A team of investigators that have devoted their lives hunting Nazi war criminals endeavor to stop him.

Cast
 Maud Adams as Amanda
 Stewart Granger as Martin Hoffmann
 Candice Daly as Ally
 Rômulo Arantes as Tonio
 Russ McCubbin as Kong
 George Lazenby as Heinrich
 Eduardo Conde as El Pasado
 William Berger as Karl
 Herb Andress as Johann

Release

Home media
It was announced on June 1, 2016 that Film Chest would be releasing the film for the first time on DVD later that year. The DVD included a fully restored HD version of the film taken from its original 35mm print. Film Chest released the film on DVD on July 5, 2016.

References

External links
 
 
 
 

1988 films
1980s action horror films
1988 horror films
1980s science fiction horror films
1988 thriller films
Mad scientist films
Films about Nazi hunters
American action horror films
American horror thriller films
American science fiction horror films
American zombie films
1980s English-language films
English-language German films
West German films
German action horror films
German science fiction horror films
Nazi zombie films
1980s American films
1980s German films